John Aston Warder House is a registered historic building near North Bend, Ohio, listed in the National Register on May 19, 1978.

The mansion served as the homestead of John Aston Warder, who is regarded as the "father of American forestry".

Notes 

Houses on the National Register of Historic Places in Ohio
Houses in Hamilton County, Ohio
National Register of Historic Places in Hamilton County, Ohio